This is a list of diplomatic missions of the Maldives. The Maldives has ties to the Commonwealth and the Islamic world, but does not seek to have an extensive number of foreign missions.  The High Commission in London was only opened as recently as 1995 - the High Commissioner died the following year and it took until 2005 for a replacement to present his credentials.

Current missions

Individual countries

Multilateral organizations

Gallery

Closed missions

Americas

See also
 Foreign relations of the Maldives
 List of diplomatic missions in the Maldives
 Visa policy of Maldives

References

Notes

External links
Ministry of Foreign Affairs

List
Maldives
Diplomatic missions